Ernst Fellner (12 January 1880 – 14 May 1900) was an Austrian figure skater who competed in men's singles.

He won the bronze medal at the 1899 European Figure Skating Championships.

Competitive highlights

References 

Austrian male single skaters
1880 births
1900 deaths
Figure skaters from Vienna